The 2005 French Open in badminton was held in Paris, from October 12 to October 16, 2005.

It was an A Category tournament and the prize money was US$10,000.

Venue
La Halle Georges Carpentier

Results

External links
2005 French Open
Badminton.de: 2005 French Open

French Open (badminton)
French Open (badminton)
Open (badminton)
French Open (badminton)
French Open (badminton)